"Sweet Leaf" is a song by English heavy metal band Black Sabbath from their  third studio album Master of Reality (1971), released on July 21, 1971. It is considered one of the band's best songs and was included on their 1976 greatest hits compilation We Sold Our Soul for Rock 'n' Roll.

Overview
The song begins with a tape loop of guitarist Tony Iommi coughing from a joint he was smoking with bandmate Ozzy Osbourne. The song's subject is cannabis, which the band was using frequently at that time. The title of the song was taken from a packet of Irish cigarettes that read "It's the sweet leaf".

Significance
"Sweet Leaf", and the Master of Reality album as a whole, arguably represents the earliest example of the music that would influence the emergence of stoner rock in California in the early 1990s. A compilation album, also titled Sweet Leaf, comprising covers of Black Sabbath songs by stoner rock bands, was released by Deadline Music in 2015.

Billy Corgan has cited the significance of 'Sweet Leaf' as an influence on the Smashing Pumpkins sound in numerous interviews, noting that he first heard the song from his uncle's copy of 'Masters of Reality' when he was 8 years old and thought "this is what God sounds like".

Samples and covers
The main guitar riff, paired with a loop of a drum sample from Led Zeppelin's "When the Levee Breaks", is the instrumental basis of the Beastie Boys' song "Rhymin & Stealin", the first track on their breakthrough album Licensed to Ill (1986).

The Butthole Surfers reworked the song as "Sweat Loaf" (1987), 

The Red Hot Chili Peppers play the riff as the outro to their hit song "Give It Away" (1991).

References

External links
Sweet Leaf on YouTube

Black Sabbath songs
1971 songs
Songs written by Ozzy Osbourne
Songs written by Tony Iommi
Songs written by Geezer Butler
Songs written by Bill Ward (musician)
Songs about cannabis
Stoner rock songs
British works about cannabis